Kings of Bachata: Sold Out At Madison Square Garden is the third live album released by Bachata group Aventura. It is based on the sold out concert that took place on September 1, 2007, at Madison Square Garden. This was part of the K.O.B. Live tour. A DVD of the concert was released November 13, 2007.  Kings of Bachata: Sold Out At Madison Square Garden was certified 8× Platinum (Latin) by the Recording Industry Association of America on June 4, 2009 for shipping 800,000 copies in the United States.

Track listing

CD

DVD

The song "La Boda" ("The Wedding") was not included in the concert film, only audio.

The song "La Novelita" ("The Little Soap Opera") was part of "Medley Old School Aventura" but it was referred on this live album as "Amor Bonito (Beautiful Love)", which is another song and The sequel to "La Novelita" song. It even had the words "La Novela 2" ("The Soap Opera 2") next to the title "Amor Bonito". The reasons for this is unknown since no questions have ever been ask about why the title was different from the actual song.

Both CD and DVD have the song "Llorar (Cry)". However, it is shown on the tracklist as 'Lloro". It also means cry depending on the sentence or on what you are referring to.

The DVD included special segments to introduce the next song involving the topic of it. Romeo only sang a piece of "Te Invito (I Invite You)" and then talked about what some people have said about it. This is why it's not in the CD version. The song "Wanna Make You Mine" was also not included in the CD version. This was probably because it was a post show bonus performance by Max Agenda and Toby Love.

Charts

Weekly charts

Year-end charts

Sales and certifications

See also
List of number-one Billboard Tropical Albums from the 2000s

References

External links
Aventura official site

Aventura (band) live albums
2007 live albums
Albums recorded at Madison Square Garden
Spanish-language live albums